Trechisibus is a genus of beetles in the family Carabidae, containing the following species:

 Trechisibus acutangulus Mateu & Belles, 1981
 Trechisibus albertaecaroli Deuve, 2006
 Trechisibus alexius Bonniard De Saludo, 1970
 Trechisibus alticola Mateu, 1979
 Trechisibus aguirrei Deuve & Moret, 2017
 Trechisibus amesi M.Etonti & Mateu, 1992
 Trechisibus amplipennis M.Etonti & Mateu, 1996
 Trechisibus antarcticus (Dejean, 1831)
 Trechisibus arduus Mateu, 1979
 Trechisibus aricensis Jeannel, 1958
 Trechisibus atratus Jeannel, 1962
 Trechisibus axillaris (Putzeys, 1870)
 Trechisibus aymara Trezzi, 2005
 Trechisibus baeckstroemi Andrewes, 1931
 Trechisibus bellesi M.Etonti & Mateu, 2002
 Trechisibus bohorquezae M.Etonti & Mateu, 1992
 Trechisibus bolivarianus Trezzi, 2011
 Trechisibus bordoni Mateu, 1978
 Trechisibus brachyderus Jeannel, 1962
 Trechisibus brevicornis Ueno, 1976
 Trechisibus bruchi Jeannel, 1937
 Trechisibus brundini Ueno, 1974
 Trechisibus calathiformis Deuve, 2002
 Trechisibus callanganus Jeannel, 1937
 Trechisibus cekalovici Jeannel, 1961
 Trechisibus chacasinus Allegro, Giachino & Sciaky, 2008
 Trechisibus chaudoiri Jeannel, 1954
 Trechisibus chloroticus (Putzeys, 1870)
 Trechisibus chucurensis Trezzi, 2007
 Trechisibus coiffaiti Bonniard De Saludo, 1970
 Trechisibus collaris Jeannel, 1961
 Trechisibus complanatus Jeannel, 1962
 Trechisibus convexiusculus Jeannel, 1962
 Trechisibus crassipes Ueno, 1972
 Trechisibus cristinensis Jeannel, 1962
 Trechisibus cuzcoensis M.Etonti & Mateu, 1996
 Trechisibus cyclopterus (Putzeys, 1870)
 Trechisibus daccordii Allegro, Giachino & Sciaky, 2008
 Trechisibus darwini Jeannel, 1927
 Trechisibus decensii Allegro, Giachino & Sciaky, 2008
 Trechisibus depressior Deuve, 2002
 Trechisibus depressus (Germain, 1855)
 Trechisibus dimaioi Casale, 1978
 Trechisibus dispar Jeannel, 1937
 Trechisibus ebeninus Jeannel, 1962
 Trechisibus eleonorae Allegro, Giachino & Sciaky, 2008
 Trechisibus falklandicus Schweiger, 1959
 Trechisibus femoralis (Germain, 1855)
 Trechisibus ferrugineus (Brulle, 1842)
 Trechisibus forsteri (Schweiger, 1958)
 Trechisibus franzi Mateu & Negre, 1972
 Trechisibus geae M.etonti & Mateu, 1998
 Trechisibus germaini Jeannel, 1962
 Trechisibus gigas Trezzi, 2007
 Trechisibus gonzalesi M.Etonti & Mateu, 1992
 Trechisibus guzzettii Trezzi, 2011
 Trechisibus homaloderoides Ueno, 1976
 Trechisibus hornensis (Fairmaire, 1885)
 Trechisibus inca Mateu, 1979
 Trechisibus incertus M.Etonti & Mateu, 1996
 Trechisibus infuscatus Mateu, 1978
 Trechisibus jasinskii Deuve, 2001
 Trechisibus jeanneli Bonniard De Saludo, 1970
 Trechisibus kamergei Jeannel, 1962
 Trechisibus kuscheli Jeannel, 1954
 Trechisibus lacunensis Mateu, 1978
 Trechisibus laevissimus (Putzeys, 1870)
 Trechisibus lamasi M.Etonti & Mateu, 1992
 Trechisibus laresensis M.Etonti & Mateu, 1996
 Trechisibus latellai Mateu & M.Etonti, 2006
 Trechisibus leechi Ueno, 1972
 Trechisibus liberatrix Mateu, 1979
 Trechisibus loeffleri Jeannel, 1958
 Trechisibus lojaensis Deuve, 2002
 Trechisibus longicornis Mateu & Negre, 1972
 Trechisibus lurdus M.Etonti & Mateu, 1999
 Trechisibus macrocephalus Jeannel, 1930
 Trechisibus magellanus Jeannel, 1961
 Trechisibus martinezi Mateu, 1978
 Trechisibus maucauensis Mateu & M.Etonti, 2002
 Trechisibus michelbacheri Ueno, 1972
 Trechisibus minutus M.Etonti & Mateu, 1996
 Trechisibus missionis Allegro, Giachino & Sciaky, 2008
 Trechisibus monrosi Mateu & Negre, 1972
 Trechisibus moreti Deuve, 2002
 Trechisibus nahuelanus Mateu & Negre, 1972
 Trechisibus nevadoi Roig-Junient & Sallenave, 2005
 Trechisibus nicki Schweiger, 1959
 Trechisibus nigripennis (Solier, 1849)
 Trechisibus nitidus (Germain, 1855)
 Trechisibus obesus Jeannel, 1954
 Trechisibus obtusiusculus Jeannel, 1962
 Trechisibus olympicus Allegro, Giachino & Sciaky, 2008
 Trechisibus oreobates Jeannel, 1962
 Trechisibus orophilus Mateu & M.Etonti, 2002
 Trechisibus ovalipennis Jeannel, 1962
 Trechisibus ovalis Jeannel, 1958
 Trechisibus pascoensis Mateu, 1978
 Trechisibus patarcochae Allegro, Giachino & Sciaky, 2008
 Trechisibus peruvianus Jeannel, 1927
 Trechisibus pierrei Mateu, 1979
 Trechisibus punaensis M.Etonti & Mateu, 2000
 Trechisibus punctiventris (Germain, 1855)
 Trechisibus pygmaeus Jeannel, 1930
 Trechisibus quierocochensis Mateu, 1978
 Trechisibus quietus M.Etonti & Mateu, 2000
 Trechisibus rarianus M.Etonti & Mateu, 1996
 Trechisibus rectangulus Jeannel, 1962
 Trechisibus rossi Ueno, 1972
 Trechisibus saizi Bonniard De Saludo, 1970
 Trechisibus schmidti Ueno, 1971
 Trechisibus setulosus Mateu & Negre, 1972
 Trechisibus sinuatus Jeannel, 1962
 Trechisibus spelaeus Mateu & Belles, 1981
 Trechisibus straneoi Bonniard De Saludo, 1970
 Trechisibus stricticollis Jeannel, 1962
 Trechisibus subglobosus Mateu & Belles, 1981
 Trechisibus tapiai Deuve, 2002
 Trechisibus tenuitarsis Mateu, 1979
 Trechisibus theresiae M.Etonti & Mateu, 1996
 Trechisibus ticliensis Trezzi, 2007
 Trechisibus topali Mateu & Negre, 1972
 Trechisibus tripunctatus Jeannel, 1958
 Trechisibus trisetosus Jeannel, 1958
 Trechisibus tucumanus Jeannel, 1962
 Trechisibus ukupachensis Trezzi, 2007
 Trechisibus valenciai M.Etonti & Mateu, 1992
 Trechisibus variicornis (Putzeys, 1870)
 Trechisibus veneroi M.Etonti & Mateu, 1992
 Trechisibus ventricosus Jeannel, 1958
 Trechisibus vivesi Mateu, 2000
 Trechisibus wachucochae Allegro, Giachino & Sciaky, 2008
 Trechisibus wardi M.Etonti, 2003
 Trechisibus yanamensis Allegro, Giachino & Sciaky, 2008

References

Trechinae